Best Group is an Aotearoa Music Award that honours New Zealand groups that have release an outstanding album in the previous year. For the purposes of the award, a group consists of two or more people. The award winner is determined by the Voting Academy, along with a 30% sales performance weighting.

The award was first presented annually since 1970 as the Group Award as part of the Loxene Golden Disc awards, then as Recording Artist/Group of the Year as part of the Recording Arts Talent Awards. From 1978, the award has been presented as part of the New Zealand Music Awards, first named Top Group, then Best Group. Shihad has won the award twice and been nominated eight other times, The Chills have also won twice and been nominated one other time, while DD Smash and The Naked and Famous have each won twice.

Recipients

Loxene Golden Disc: Group Award (1970 to 1972)

Recording Arts Talent Awards: Recording Artist/Group of the Year (1973 to 1977)

New Zealand Music Awards: Top Group (1978 to 1984)

New Zealand Music Awards: Best Group (1985 to 2016)

References 

Best Group
Awards established in 1970